Bruno Guse (born 13 July 1939) is a German former boxer. He competed at the 1960 Summer Olympics and the 1964 Summer Olympics. At the 1960 Summer Olympics, he lost to Yuri Radonyak of the Soviet Union, and at the 1964 Summer Olympics, he lost to Ričardas Tamulis, also of the Soviet Union.

References

External links
 

1939 births
Living people
German male boxers
Olympic boxers of the United Team of Germany
Boxers at the 1960 Summer Olympics
Boxers at the 1964 Summer Olympics
People from Volyn Oblast
Welterweight boxers